Menzel Bouzaiane is a town and commune in the Sidi Bou Zid Governorate, Tunisia. As of 2004 it had a population of 5,595.

See also
List of cities in Tunisia

References

Populated places in Tunisia
Communes of Tunisia